Akseli and Elina is a 1970 Finnish drama film directed by Edvin Laine. It was entered into the 7th Moscow International Film Festival. The film is based on the third volume of Väinö Linna's novel trilogy Under the North Star. It's a sequel to the 1968 film Here, Beneath the North Star which was based on the two first volumes of the trilogy.

Cast
 Aarno Sulkanen as Akseli Koskela
 Ulla Eklund as Elina Koskela
 Risto Taulo as Jussi Koskela
 Anja Pohjola as Alma Koskela
 Mirjam Novero as Anna Kivivuori
 Kauko Helovirta as Otto Kivivuori
 Esa Saario as Janne Kivivuori
 Rose-Marie Precht as Ellen Salpakari
 Matti Ranin as Lauri Salpakari
 Maija-Leena Soinne as Aune Leppänen
 Jussi Jurkka as Siukola

References

External links
 

1970 films
1970 drama films
1970s Finnish-language films
Films directed by Edvin Laine
Films based on Finnish novels
Films based on works by Väinö Linna
Finnish drama films